The Fonte della Fata Morgana (Fountain of Fata Morgana), locally also called '"Casina delle Fate" (Little Fairy House), at Grassina, is a small garden building located not far from Florence, Italy, in the comune of Bagno a Ripoli. It was built in 1573–74 as a garden feature in the extensive grounds of the Villa il Riposo of Bernardo Vecchietti on the slope of the hill called Fattucchia.

It is among that group of artificial garden grottoes and nympheums made for private gardens, and less well known than those in the Boboli Gardens or the Medici villa at Pratolino. The Fonte della Fata Morgana at one time was enriched by sculptures, including one by Giambologna. Recently acquired by the Comune di Bagno a Ripoli, the site is under restoration.

Buildings and structures completed in 1574
Gardens in Florence
Mannerist architecture